Everything Matters But No One Is Listening is the debut studio album by Beach Slang's lead singer James Alex and his side project Quiet Slang. It was released on May 18, 2018 under Polyvinyl Record Co.

Critical reception
Everything Matters But No One Is Listening was met with generally favorable reviews from critics. At Metacritic, which assigns a weighted average rating out of 100 to reviews from mainstream publications, this release received an average score of 62, based on 5 reviews.

Track listing

Charts

References

2018 albums
Beach Slang albums
Polyvinyl Record Co. albums